Events in the year 1884 in China.

Incumbents
 Guangxu Emperor (10th year)
 Regent: Empress Dowager Cixi

Events
Sino-French War
March 6–24 - Bắc Ninh Campaign
May 11 - Tientsin Accord
June 23–24 - Bắc Lệ ambush
August 23–26 - Battle of Fuzhou
October 2–15 - Kep Campaign
November 19 - Battle of Yu Oc
 Xinjiang province (Sinkang) established

Births
February 20 - Yang Sen (1884-1977)
 Fang Junying (1884-1923), Revolutionary Tongmenghui member

Deaths
Zhang Shusheng

 
Years of the 19th century in China